Kyongawon is a village in Kyain Seikgyi Township, Kawkareik District, in the Kayin State of Myanmar. It lies on the Kyungawon Chaung, which runs from west to east through the village.

References

External links

Maplandia World Gazetteer

Populated places in Kayin State